The natural horn is a musical instrument that is the predecessor to the modern-day (French) horn (differentiated by its lack of valves). Throughout the seventeenth and eighteenth century the natural horn evolved as a separation from the trumpet by widening the bell and lengthening the tubes. It consists of a mouthpiece, long coiled tubing, and a large flared bell. 
This instrument was used extensively until the emergence of the valved horn in the early 19th century.

Hand stopping technique 

The natural horn has several gaps in its harmonic range. To play chromatically, in addition to crooking the instrument into the right key, two additional techniques are required: bending and hand-stopping. Bending a note is achieved by modifying the embouchure to raise or lower the pitch fractionally, and compensates for the slightly out-of-pitch "wolf tones" which all brass instruments have. Hand-stopping is a technique whereby the player can modify the pitch of a note by up to a semitone (or sometimes slightly more) by inserting a cupped hand into the bell. Both techniques change the timbre as well as the pitch.

It is commonly thought that hand technique emerged during the first half of the eighteenth century at the Dresden court with the horn player Anton Hampel. Domnich (1807) cited Hampel as the inventor of this technique and recounted the "invention" in which Hampel, trying to emulate oboist colleagues who used cotton plugs to "mute" their instruments, tried the same with his horn and was "surprised to find that the pitch of his instrument rose by a semitone. In a flash of inspiration he realised that by alternately inserting and withdrawing the cotton plug he could cover without a break every diatonic and chromatic scale."

Pitch changes are made through a few techniques:
 Modulating the lip tension as done with modern brass instruments. This allows for notes in the harmonic series to be played.
 Changing the length of the instrument by switching the crooks. This is a rather slow process. Before the advent of the modern valved horn, many ideas were attempted to speed up the process of changing the key of the instrument. Crooks were in common use by 1740.
 Changing the position of the hand in the bell; this is called hand-stopping. The effect is a pitch that lowers the harmonic, but dampens the sound.

Repertoire 

The repertoire for horn includes many pieces that were originally written with the natural horn in mind. Until the development of the modern horn in the early to mid-19th century, Western music employed the natural horn and its natural brass brethren. Substantial contributors to the horn repertoire include Handel, Haydn, Mozart, Beethoven, Telemann, Weber, Brahms and many others.

The chromatic abilities of recently developed brass instruments, however, opened new possibilities for composers of the Romantic era, and fit with the artistic currents of the time. By the end of the 19th century and the beginning of the 20th century, almost all music was written for the modern valved horn.

However, the natural horn still found its way into the works of some composers. Brahms did not care for the valved horn and wrote for natural horn. Benjamin Britten's Serenade for Tenor, Horn and Strings, though written for the modern horn, makes notable use of the F harmonic series and has been recorded at least once on a natural horn.

György Ligeti's Hamburg Concerto makes a great use of the natural horn and of natural sounds on the modern horn in the solo part and requires four natural horns in the orchestra.

Natural horn and the modern horn 
Below lists natural horn keys with their corresponding fingering on the modern horn. If a piece of music says the key on the left you can press the key combination on the right on the modern double horn to get the correct tube length. This is useful for simulating natural horn when playing older compositions.

 B alto – T0
 A  – T2
 A  – T1
 G   – T12
 G/F  – T23
 F   – open
 E   – 2
 E  – 1
 D   – 12
 D  – 23
 C   – 13
 B basso – 123 (generally very sharp; pull tuning slide and/or valve slides out somewhat)
 B basso – not possible on F horn, unless you pull all the valve slides and tuning slide out as far as they will go (without detaching) and then use the 123 fingering. Even then, the intonation may still be sharp, and a greater degree of hand in the horn bell can be needed.

See also
Alphorn
Natural trumpet

References

External links 
 The Cyber Horn Museum
 Ericson, John. The Natural Horn.
 Seraphinoff, Richard. Natural Horns.

 
Baroque instruments
Orchestral instruments